Pama language may refer to:

 One of the Paman languages
 Pamainá language, a variety of Karipuná
 Pama language (Arawa), a dialect of Jamamadí

See also
 Pama–Nyungan languages